Afilia is a genus of moths of the family Notodontidae described by Schaus in 1901 .

Species
Afilia oslari Dyar, 1904
Afilia cinerea Schaus, 1901
Afilia purulha (Schaus, 1921)

References

Notodontidae